ukhandampondo (poll tax) is the second album by the South African music project Bambata, released in 2002. It continues on the themes of the first album 1906, focusing on the year 1906 and the Bambatha rebellion against English and the poll tax the latter had created.

The album was nominated for the Best Zulu Music Album in the 9th South African Music Awards in 2003.

Track listing

 "Ucijimpi" (Philangezwi Bongani Nkwanyana), arr. Mandla Zikalala
Lead vocals Philangezwi Bongani Nkwanyana
 "ukhandampondo" (Philangezwi Bongani Nkwanyana), arr. Mthandeni Mvelase
Lead vocals Philangezwi Bongani Nkwanyana
 "Epalamende" (Maxhegwana Johannes Zuma), arr. Jabu Khanyile
Lead vocals Maxhegwana Johannes Zuma
 "Uyindlondlo" (Maxhegwana Johannes Zuma)
Lead vocals Maxhegwana Johannes Zuma
 "Isinqawunqawu" (Philangezwi Bongani Nkwanyana), arr. Mandla Zikalala & Mthandeni Mvelase
Lead vocals Philangezwi Bongani Nkwanyana
 "Bayizizwe" (Philangezwi Bongani Nkwanyana), arr. Mandla Zikalala
Lead vocals Philangezwi Bongani Nkwanyana
 "Uthando" (Philangezwi Bongani Nkwanyana)
Lead vocals Philangezwi Bongani Nkwanyana
 "Umalume" (Maxhegwana Johannes Zuma), arr. Mthandeni Mvelase & Philangezwi Bongani Nkwanyana
Lead vocals Maxhegwana Johannes Zuma
 "Icala" (Maxhegwana Johannes Zuma)
Lead vocals Maxhegwana Johannes Zuma
 "Ekuphakameni" (Sipho Sithole), arr. Sipho Sithole, Mthandeni Mvelase & . Mandla Zikalala
Lead vocals Sipho Sithole
 "Bayizizwe" (Rudeboy Mix) (Philangezwi Bongani Nkwanyana)
Lead vocals Philangezwi Bongani Nkwanyana
Guest rap: Rude Boy Paul

Musicians

Maskandi guitar: Mzala Zuma, Philangezwi Bongani Nkwanyana
Acoustic guitar: Ntokozo Zungu, Bheki Khoza
Keyboards: Mthandeni Mvelase
Saxophone: Khaya Dlamini
Bass guitar: Mandla Zikalala
Drums: Kwazi Shange
Drums on track 7: Nkanyezi Cele
Percussion: Bassy Mahlasela
Horns: Shembe Traditional Horns (Izimbomu): Mqhawuleni Khanyile & Mathambo Nzuza

Production credits

Produced by: Jabu Khanyile & Sipho Sithole
Assistant producer: Mthandeni Mvelase
Executive producer: Sipho Sithole
Assistant executive producer: Philangezwi Bongani Nkwanyana
Recorded and mixed at Downtown Studios
Engineer: Ray Mavundla
Programming engineer: Mthandeni Mvelase
Mixing: Peter Pearlson, except tracks 10 and 11: Marvin Moses
Mastering: Peter Pearlson at Forest Studios
Sleeve design: Candice Blignaut
Project Management: Native Rhythm Productions

References

Zulu music
Bambata (musical project) albums
2002 albums